The following elections occurred in the year 1850.

Europe
 1850 Belgian general election
 1850 Dutch general election
 1850 Greek legislative election
 1850 Norwegian parliamentary election

North America

United States
 California's At-large congressional district
 1850 New York state election
 1850 and 1851 United States House of Representatives elections
 1850 and 1851 United States Senate elections

See also
 :Category:1850 elections

1850
Elections